Kristen Michal (born 12 July 1975) is an Estonian politician. member of the Estonian Reform Party, he was the minister of economic affairs and infrastructure in Taavi Rõivas' cabinet between 9 April 2015 and 22 November 2016. Previously, Michal served as the minister of justice from 2011 to 2012.

Early life and education
Michal was born in Tallinn on 2 July 1975. He studied law at Academy Nord and graduated in 2009. He has been pursuing master's study in law at Tallinn University's Law School since 2009.

Political career
Michal worked as an advisor at different levels for the Reform Party from 1996 to 2002. He became an advisor to then prime minister Siim Kallas in 2002. Michal served as the Elder of the Tallinn City Centre for one year (2002–2003). In 2003, he was named as the secretary general of the Reform Party and held this post until 2011. Michal has been a member of the Riigikogu from 2005 to 2011 and from 2012 to 2015. He was appointed Minister of Justice on 6 April 2011, replacing another Reform Party member Rein Lang. Michal's term ended on 10 December 2012, when he resigned from office. He was replaced by Hanno Pevkur as the minister of justice. From 9 April 2015 to 23 November 2016 he served as the minister of economic affairs and infrastructure.

Controversy
In May 2012, it was claimed by Silver Meikar, a Reform Party member and a former member of the Riigikogu, that the Reform Party has been receiving donations from dubious sources for years. He further argued that Michal was informed about these donations. Both Michal and Prime Minister Andrus Ansip denied these allegations. However, upon these accusations, the delegates from the Council of Europe's GRECO anti-corruption watchdog visited the country in June 2012. On 31 July 2012, the Estonian State Prosecutor's Office announced that Michal and Kalev Lillo, another Reform Party member, were suspects of this event and that they both had been interrogated. Michal was investigated on accusations of money laundering and illegal party financing. On 10 September 2012, the first day of parliamentary session, the Social Democratic Party's faction started a petition process for the resignation of Michal through a vote of no confidence. However, petition failed on 19 September 2012 when the party gave up the process. Michal announced that if he would be found guilty, he would resign from his post. Estonian State Prosecutor's Office closed the case on 15 October 2012.

On 15 October 2012, the prosecutor general closed the investigation. Back then, prosecutor Heli Sepp stated that the investigation was concluded with no evidence supporting the accusations.

References

External links

1975 births
21st-century Estonian lawyers
Estonian Reform Party politicians
Government ministers of Estonia
Justice ministers of Estonia
Living people
Members of the Riigikogu, 2003–2007
Members of the Riigikogu, 2007–2011
Members of the Riigikogu, 2011–2015
Members of the Riigikogu, 2015–2019
Members of the Riigikogu, 2019–2023
Members of the Riigikogu, 2023–2027
Politicians from Tallinn
Tallinn University alumni